Giles Tooker (c 1565 – 25 November 1623) was an English lawyer and politician who sat in the House of Commons between 1601 and 1614.

Tooker was the son of Charles Tooker, yeoman of Maddingley and his wife Matilda Nipperhead. His father died in 1571 when he was six leaving him well endowed financially. He was educated at Barnard's Inn and entered Lincoln's Inn in 1581. In 1589, he was called to the bar. He was a member of counsel to Salisbury in 1591.

In 1601, Tooker was elected Member of Parliament for Salisbury. He was re-elected  MP for Salisbury in 1604. He led  the movement for the emancipation of Salisbury and when it was incorporated in 1611, he became the first recorder of the city, holding office until his death. He was also recorder of Wilton. In 1614, he was re-elected MP for Salisbury. He was treasurer of his inn from 1617 to 1618.

When he died at the age of about 67, Tooker owned property in Maydenton, Madington, Burton, Hammington, Charleton, Chesenbury, Bulkington and Eston as well as his house in Salisbury.

Tooker married  Elizabeth Eyre, daughter of Thomas Eyre of Salisbury on 9 September 1586 and had two sons and two daughters.

References

1560s births
1623 deaths
Year of birth uncertain
People from Salisbury
People from Wilton, Wiltshire
Members of Lincoln's Inn
English lawyers
16th-century English lawyers
17th-century English lawyers
English MPs 1601
English MPs 1604–1611
English MPs 1614